Boomerang is an album by Stacey Q released in 1997, showcasing the singer's conversion to Buddhism. The album is folk-spiritual, featuring Stacey Q's version of "My Sweet Lord". The single "Tenderness" peaked on the Jamaican charts at number five.

Track listing
 "Boomerang" (Scott Matthews, Jenni Muldaur, Bob Miller) (3:06)
 "Tenderness" (Janis Ian, Buddy Mondlock) (3:41)
 "Holding Onto The Earth" (Sam Phillips, T-Bone Burnett) (2:52)
 "I Doubt If It Does To You" (Gwil Owen) (3:31)
 "Love On" (Matthews, Muldaur, Andy Milton) (3:31)
 "Tara" (Stacey Swain) (4:36)
 "Never Stop" (Michael Eckhart, Dain Noel, Swain) (3:54)
 "My Sweet Lord" (George Harrison) (4:14)
 "All I Ever Wanted" (Eckhart, Noel, Swain) (4:05)
 "Something About You" (Eckhart) (4:20)
 "I Don't Know How To Say Goodbye To You" (Phillips) (3:30)
 "Clear Light" (Swain) (5:45)

Personnel

Musicians
 Stacey Q. - lead vocals, background vocals
 Basil Fung - guitar, (tracks 1-11) machine (track 9)
 Larry Milton - guitar (tracks 2, 5)
 Brendon McNichol - guitar (track 6), Russian balalaika (track 10)
 Bradley Cummings - bass (tracks 1-8, 10-11)
 Johnny Friday - drums (tracks 1-7)
 Frank Reina - percussion (tracks 1, 8, 11) drums (tracks 8, 10-11)
 Peter Bunetta - percussion (tracks 2-4, 10)
 Carlos Murguia - B3 (tracks 1-5, 11)
 Michael Eckhart - technics keyboards and programming
 Dain Noel - technics keyboards and programming
 Gene Van Buren - background vocals (track 4)

Production
 Gabe Drapel - executive producer
 George Grimm - executive director
 Fred Burgouise - publishing administration for Bug Music
 Eddie Gomez - publishing administration for Bug Music
 Steve Levesque - publicity for The Lee Solters Company
 Westminster Press - visual art
 Dean Lopez - photography
 Maxx (Maxx Salon) - Stacey's cut & color
 Gregg Wadley - boomerang (front cover)
 Margaret Clampitt - hospitality
 Charles Clampitt - hospitality
 Leah-Donna Geon - hospitality, personal assistance
 Peter Jordan - hospitality, security
 Betty Wontorek - hospitality
 Bernie Wontorek - hospitality
 Dave Collins - mastering
 Debbie Korvitz - support team
 Sean Winstian - support team
 Sebastian Reich - support team
 Raj Butani - support team
 Gregg Ryan - support team
 Gina Quartaro - support team
 Tim Crandall - support team

External links
https://web.archive.org/web/20110524064233/http://www.mp3.com/albums/267151/summary.html

References
 [ AMG]
 Amazon

Stacey Q albums
Folk rock albums by American artists